Independent Greens may refer to:

 Independent Greens (Denmark)
 Independent Greens of Virginia
 Maine Green Independent Party